Joanna Blythman (born 1956) is a British investigative food journalist and writer and a commentator on the British food chain who has covered subjects including salmon farming, supermarkets, intensive pineapple production, bird flu and the causes of obesity.

Blythman was born in Springburn in Glasgow, the daughter of lecturer in Education, Marion Blythman and socialist campaigner and Scottish republican songwriter Morris Blythman.

As of 2006, Blythman has won five Glenfiddich Awards for her writing, including a Glenfiddich Special Award for her first book, The Food We Eat, and the Glenfiddich Food Book of the Year Award in 2005 for Shopped, as well as a Caroline Walker Media Award for Improving the Nation's Health by Means of Good Food, and a Guild of Food Writers Award for The Food We Eat. In 2004, she won one of BBC Radio 4's Food and Farming Awards, the Derek Cooper Award. In 2007 she was awarded the Good Housekeeping award for Outstanding Contribution to Food. She has also written two other books, How to Avoid GM Food and The Food Our Children Eat. Her other books are What To Eat (2012) and Swallow This (2015).

Blythman broadcasts regularly on issues relating to food (Tonight, BBC Breakfast, GMTV, The Money Programme, Dispatches, Time Shift and on Radio 4 The Food Programme and Woman's Hour). She writes a weekly restaurant review and an opinion column for the Sunday Herald, and has contributed to newspapers and magazines including The Observer Food Monthly, Daily Mail, Guardian, BBC Countryfile magazine, Olive magazine, The Oldie and The Grocer.

Bibliography

References

External links
Official site

1956 births
Living people
Alumni of City, University of London
British food writers
British investigative journalists
Journalists from Glasgow